The Kanching Falls are located between Kuala Lumpur and Rawang in Selangor, Malaysia, and is a popular tourist destination in Kuala Lumpur. The waterfalls consist of seven tiers. A well-maintained recreation park provides access to the lower falls. To reach the upper falls uphill scrambling may be necessary.

References

External links 
 Kanching Falls
 

Waterfalls of Malaysia
Nature sites of Selangor
Landforms of Selangor